Multiverse is the seventh solo studio album by American rapper Wiz Khalifa, released July 29, 2022, by Taylor Gang Entertainment and Asylum Records. Khalifa announced the album July 13 along with revealing the cover art. This is Khalifa's first solo album since 2018's Rolling Papers 2, but his third full project of 2022, the other two being his collaborative albums Stoner's Night with Juicy J and Full Court Press with Big K.R.I.T., Smoke DZA, and Girl Talk. The deluxe edition was released on October 21, 2022 with 3 new songs.

Background 
When asked by Stereogums Earl Hopkins how the album adds to his legacy, Khalifa said that "as an artist, it shows a lot of growth — things that people might know about me", "gives me an opportunity to touch on a lot of different subjects and talk about things in different ways, but still get the same respect or reaction", and "shows a lot of freedom as far as taking risks, designing things the way I see them fit, and also not going straight towards a trend or what they see as popular, but to create something else and give people the option to dive into it." With Vibes Preezy Brown, Wiz explained the album's name coming "from the unique world that I live in and experience", as well as the process of building and recording from his home studio in Encino, California. For VMan, Khalifa said the central theme of the album was love: "There's the love of relationships, love of me being a father, and love for yourself. Those are a lot of the main topics that I wanted to talk about and bring to the forefront." For the album name, the word "multiverse" "takes on new meanings": "So you have the 'multi-' which shows how versatile I am, and then you have 'verse', which is what I'm saying."

Style and reception 
Shifters Kevin Bourne writes that Khalifa "has returned to form as a solo artist" and "brings his full repertoire and arsenal to the project, exploring different themes and sounds, while delivering a complete body of work." This includes album opener "Big Daddy Wiz"'s "little groove and funk", which contains a sample of Cheryl Lynn's "Got to Be Real"; "1000 Women" with a saxophone accompaniment and lyrics about Khalifa's "priority being having children and one woman in his life", which "is grown ass man messaging that is in stark contrast to what we hear in music today"; "Keys" which contrasts "beautiful storytelling about life and love" with drill production; and closer "Thank Him" which sees Khalifa discussing his faith in God. The album as a whole shows "a content, happy and free Khalifa" and "exudes the freedom we've always known him for, but perhaps in even greater measure (and it's refreshing to hear and experience) along with "mature content with good messaging, demonstrating growth without coming across as preachy or corny."

Clashs Naima Sutton notes the album having "drill, hip-hop, pop, R&B and a little bit of 80s synth influences floating around." In some ways, the album "present[s] as slightly confused", but in others it "delve[s] into a more experimental realm than Wiz had been through in his past releases." This experimentation brings a risk of "sounding a little bit out of place and not in the avant-garde 'I wanted it like that' kind of way", which "appears to be what happened on "We Don't Go Out to Nightclubs Anymore/Candlelight Girl" where a brilliant horn-laden intro gives way to a second half that places an ill-fitting pop-style lyricism on top of what would otherwise be a spectacular interlude." While it "seems incredibly limiting to hold an artist like Wiz Khalifa to his highest points on every release", and Khalifa "connects very closely with the message he's putting together", the album "couldn't be presented as his best work", though "it still holds weight in the scope of his releases and points to an artist who is still seeking adaptation and new spaces from growth within their catalogue."

The Honey Pops Kristian Gonzales notes the album's fusion of hip hop with 1970s-80s R&B and pop as possibly inspired by Childish Gambino & Tyler, the Creator, as well as highlighting "MVP"'s "G-funk vibe & singsong flows"; "Something Real"'s "deepest venture into pop balladry, delivering a track fit for a 1980s John Hughes film"; "We Don't Go Out to Nightclubs Anymore/Candlelight Girl" "echo[ing] the quiet storm romanticism of New Edition & Luther Vandross"; and "Mirror Love (Groove 2)" which "continues the 1980s vibe reminiscent of Phil Collins & Prince, complete with an electric guitar solo."

Track listing

Personnel 
 Wiz Khalifa – lead vocals
 Aaron Dahl – engineering
 Eric "E. Dan" Dan – mixing engineer
 Joe LaPorta – mastering engineer

References 

2022 albums
Wiz Khalifa albums
Asylum Records albums
Hip hop albums by American artists